Bektas Abdihanuly Beknazarov  (Bektas Äbdıhanūly Beknazarov); is a Kazakh politician who served as Deputy Chair of the Senate of Kazakhstan from September 2016 to August 2020, and the 6th Chairman of the Supreme Court of Kazakhstan from April 2011 to October 2013.

References 
 Бекназаров Бектас Абдыханович

1956 births
Living people
Kazakhstani politicians
Kazakhstani jurists
People from Jambyl Region